The Journal of International Criminal Justice is a peer reviewed academic journal of international criminal law. It is published by Oxford University Press.

References 

Oxford University Press academic journals
Law journals